Still Telling Everybody: 30 Years of Hits is a greatest hits album by Australian vocal group Human Nature. The album was released in November 2019 to coincide with the group's induction into the ARIA Hall of Fame. Still Telling Everybody: 30 Years of Hits peaked at number 3 on the ARIA Charts.

Background and release
Human Nature started as the 4 Trax in Sydney in late 1989 and signed with Sony before changing their name to Human Nature in 1995. In March 1996, Human Nature released their debut single "Got It Goin' On" which peaked at number 19 on the ARIA Singles Chart. Since then, Human Nature have released 13 studio albums, 4 of which have peaked at number 1 in Australia, and 15 top 20 singles. In Australia, the group have album sales in excess of 2.5 million units.
 
In early 2019, Human Nature were awarded the Medal of the Order of Australia (OAM) for their service to the performing arts and entertainment field. In November 2019, the group were announced as the ARIA Hall of Fame inductees at the ARIA Music Awards of 2019.

Track listing
CD1

 
CD2

Charts

Weekly charts

Year-end charts

Release history

References

2019 greatest hits albums
Human Nature (band) albums
Sony Music Australia albums
Compilation albums by Australian artists